General elections were held in Dominica in July 1925. They were the first after the reintroduction of elected members to the Legislative Council for the first time since 1898.

Electoral system
The reformed Legislative Council had 13 members, with the Administrator as President, six 'official' members (civil servants), four elected members and two appointed members. Candidacy for the elected seats was limited to people with an annual income of at least £200 or owning property valued at £500 or more.

Results
All four elected members were black.

The appointed members were J.R.H. Bridgewater and Laughlan Rose. Rose resigned on 27 March 1926 and was replaced by Henry Harry Vivian Whitchurch.

References

Dominica
1925 in Dominica
Elections in Dominica
Dominica
Election and referendum articles with incomplete results
July 1925 events